Vlasov is a rural locality (a khutor) in Alexeyevsky District, Belgorod Oblast, Russia. The population was 173 as of 2010. There are 2 streets.

Geography 
Vlasov is located 32 km south of Alexeyevka (the district's administrative centre) by road. Zhukovo is the nearest rural locality.

References 

Rural localities in Alexeyevsky District, Belgorod Oblast
Biryuchensky Uyezd